Luis Cesar Fraiz Santamaría (born 13 June 1993) is a Panamanian football defender who plays for Plaza Amador.

Club career
Fraiz was part of the Frosinone squad that won the club a first promotion to Serie A in 2015, but played only a league game himself.

References

External links
 
 Player profile - Frosinone Calcio

1993 births
Living people
Association football defenders
Panamanian footballers
C.D. Árabe Unido players
Frosinone Calcio players
Panamanian expatriate footballers
Expatriate footballers in Italy
Serie B players